"Great Things" is a song by American contemporary Christian musician Phil Wickham. The song was released on June 1, 2018, as the third single from his seventh studio album, Living Hope (2018). It impacted Christian radio on December 26, 2019. Wickham co-wrote the song with Jonas Myrin, and collaborated with Jonathan Smith in the production of the single.

Background
On June 1, 2018, Phil Wickham released "Great Things" as the third single from Living Hope, an album which was slated for release in August 2018, along with its accompanying lyric video. Wickham shared the story behind the song, saying: 

The song was released to Christian radio on December 26, 2019.

Composition
"Great Things" is a corporate worship song, composed in the key of B Major with a tempo of 124 beats per minute. Wickham's vocal range spans from B4 to F5.

Music videos
The lyric video of "Great Things" was published on Phil Wickham's YouTube channel on June 12, 2018. The live performance video for the "Great Things // King of My Heart" House Sessions rendition was released on January 18, 2019, to YouTube. On May 6, 2019, the Singalong 4 live performance video of the song was availed on YouTube.

Accolades

Charts

Weekly charts

Year-end charts

Release history

References

External links
 

2018 singles
Contemporary Christian songs
Phil Wickham songs
Songs written by Phil Wickham